The 1927 Washington Huskies football team was an American football team that represented the University of Washington during the 1927 college football season. In its seventh season under head coach Enoch Bagshaw, the team compiled a 9–2 record, finished in fourth place in the Pacific Coast Conference, and outscored all opponents by a combined total of 287 to 59. Earl Wilson was the team captain.

Schedule

References

Washington
Washington Huskies football seasons
Washington Huskies football